The men's long jump was a track and field athletics event held as part of the athletics at the 1904 Summer Olympics programme. It was the third time the event was held. Nine athletes from three nations participated. The competition was held on Thursday, September 1, 1904.

Myer Prinstein, who had taken second place in 1900 after leading in the first round of jumping but declining to compete in the second due to it being held on a Sunday, won the contest and set a new Olympic record for distance. It was the third straight victory for the United States and the second time (after 1896) the Americans had swept the medals in the event. Prinstein became the first man to win two medals in the event.

Background

This was the third appearance of the event, which is one of 12 athletics events to have been held at every Summer Olympics. Myer Prinstein of the United States, who took silver in 1900, was the only jumper from Paris to return in 1904. Peter O'Connor would have been the favorite, but again did not appear. That left Prinstein as the favorite, though Daniel Frank had beaten him at the AAU meet.

Australia made its first appearance in the event. The United States appeared for the third time, the only nation to have long jumpers at each of the first three Games.

Competition format

After having two rounds in 1900, the 1904 format returned to the single-round format used in 1896.

Records

These were the standing world and Olympic records (in metres) prior to the 1904 Summer Olympics.

Myer Prinstein set a new Olympic record with 7.34 metres.

Schedule

Results

References

Sources
 

Athletics at the 1904 Summer Olympics
Long jump at the Olympics